Beserah is a town located in Kuantan District, Pahang, Malaysia.

Initially, Beserah consisted of several traditional villages, including Pantai village, Pelindung village, Rumbia village, Chetty village, Bugis village, Darat Sekolah village, Jeram village, Alor Tuan Haji village, Jambu village, Kubur village, Tuan village, Masjid village, Pasir Garam village, Baru village, Alor Ladang village, Bahagia village, Batu Hitam Beach village, Padang To'Cha village and Bukit Batu Hitam village. 

The increase in population has created a structured settlement and among the earliest is Rumah Murah and Taman Beserah. Beserah is a fishing village and is known as a manufacturer and supplier of various products from the sea. Local residents work as fishermen and are also involved in salted fish, anchovies, crackers and other work based on resources from the sea.

The people who live on the land side depend on rubber and durian. Paddy was once cultivated in Beserah. Batik cloth companies and small handicraft companies from sea shells and coconut can be found here.

References

Kuantan District
Towns in Pahang